Couvade syndrome, also called sympathetic pregnancy, is a proposed condition in which an expectant father experiences some of the same symptoms and behavior as his pregnant partner. These most often include major weight gain, altered hormone levels, morning nausea, and disturbed sleep patterns. In more extreme cases, symptoms can include labor pains, fatigue, postpartum depression, and nosebleeds. The labor pain symptom is commonly known as sympathy pain.

The source of Couvade Syndrome is a matter of debate. Some believe it to be a psychosomatic condition, while others believe it may have biological causes relating to hormone changes.

The name derives from "couvade", a class of male pregnancy rituals.

Symptoms
Symptoms experienced by the partner can include stomach pain, back pain, indigestion, changes in appetite, weight gain, acne, diarrhea, constipation, headache, toothache, cravings, nausea, breast augmentation, breast growth, dry navel, hardening of the nipple, excessive earwax, and insomnia. A qualitative study listed 35 symptoms from Couvade literature, including gastrointestinal, genitourinary, respiratory, oral or dental, stiffening of the glutes, generalized aches and pains, and other symptoms.

Psychological hypotheses
Psychological causes suggested have included anxiety, pseudo-sibling rivalry, identification with the fetus, ambivalence about fatherhood, or parturition envy. According to Osvlosky and Culp (1989), pregnancy causes the male counterpart to experience an emergence of ambivalence as well as a recurrence of Oedipal conflict. In 1920s France, Couvade was claimed to be more common in conditions where sex roles are flexible and the female is of a dominant status.

Physiological hypotheses

Studies have shown that the male partner cohabitating with a pregnant female will experience hormonal shifts in his prolactin, cortisol, estradiol, and testosterone levels, typically starting at the end of the first trimester and continuing through several weeks post-partum.

References

Further reading

External links 
Feeling Her Pain The Male Pregnancy Experience

Elusive Couvade Syndrome
 

Andrology
Culture-bound syndromes
Human pregnancy